Walworth is a district of London, England

Walworth or Wallworth may also refer to:

Places
United Kingdom
 Walworth, County Durham, England

United States
 Walworth County, South Dakota
 Walworth County, Wisconsin
 Walworth, Nebraska
 Walworth, New York
 Walworth, Wisconsin, a village
 Walworth (town), Wisconsin, a town

People
 Lynette Wallworth, Australian artist and filmmaker
 T. J. Wallworth, acting secretary of Manchester United in 1912
 Ellen Hardin Walworth (1832-1915), American lawyer and activist
 Jeannette Walworth (1835–1918), American novelist, journalist
 Reuben H. Walworth (1788-1867), American lawyer and politician
 William Walworth (died 1385), Lord Mayor of London

See also
 Wallworth Lake and Wallworth Park, in Haddonfield, New Jersey, U.S.
 Walworth Gate, a hamlet in the parish of Walworth, County Durham
 Low Walworth, a hamlet in the parish of Walworth, County Durham